Héctor H. Acosta (born 9 December 1933) is an Argentine former cyclist. He competed at the 1960 Summer Olympics and the 1964 Summer Olympics.

References

External links
 

1933 births
Living people
Argentine male cyclists
Olympic cyclists of Argentina
Cyclists at the 1960 Summer Olympics
Cyclists at the 1964 Summer Olympics
Sportspeople from Rosario, Santa Fe
Pan American Games medalists in cycling
Pan American Games silver medalists for Argentina
Pan American Games bronze medalists for Argentina
Competitors at the 1959 Pan American Games
Cyclists at the 1963 Pan American Games
20th-century Argentine people
Medalists at the 1959 Pan American Games
Medalists at the 1963 Pan American Games